Eric Hehman (born August 11, 1972) is an American football  coach and former player. He is currently the head football coach at Olivet Nazarene University, a position he has held since 2016.  Hehman served as the head football coach at Greenville College in Greenville, Illinois from 2005 to 2009 and at Malone University from 2010 to 2015.

Coaching career

Greenville
Hehman has as the head football coach at Greenville College in Greenville, Illinois, an NCAA Division III, school from 2005 to 2009.  He led the Panthers to a 7–3 record in 2009 including a berth in the NCCAA 2009 Victory Bowl (losing to Geneva College 29–28).  This was the first postseason appearance for Greenville since 2000. The team also captured the Upper Midwest Athletic Conference South Division championship (3–0 record), which was the first Division III conference title for the program. In his five years at Greenville, his teams posted an overall record of 25–22.

Malone
On December 28, 2009, Hehman was named the new head coach of the Malone Pioneers football team.  Hehman took over for four-year head coach Mike Gardner, who resigned recently to take the head coaching position at his former institution, Tabor College in Hillsboro, Kansas.

In his first season at Malone, his team finished 3–7 (2–5 in conference play).

Head coaching record

References

External links
 Olivet Nazarene profile

1972 births
Living people
Greenville Panthers football coaches
Malone Pioneers football coaches
Olivet Nazarene Tigers football coaches
Taylor Trojans football coaches
Taylor Trojans football players
Trinity International Trojans football coaches